Blaby railway station was a railway station on the Birmingham to Peterborough Line that served Blaby in Leicestershire, England.

The station was opened in 1864 by the South Leicestershire Railway, which was taken over by the London and North Western Railway in 1867. British Railways closed the station in 1968.

In July 1914, local suffragettes Ellen Sheriff and Elizabeth Frisby, along with experienced arsonist Kitty Marion, armed with wood-shavings dipped in creosol (and an axe, to break in) trekked across a field in the middle of the night and burned the station down, causing £500-worth of damage.

A campaign to re-open the station was launched in 2008. Preserved Bagnall fireless steam locomotive no. 2370 is being used to publicise the re-opening campaign.

References

Disused railway stations in Leicestershire
Former London and North Western Railway stations
Railway stations in Great Britain opened in 1864
Railway stations in Great Britain closed in 1968
Beeching closures in England